Andre Peter "Andy" Gambucci (November 12, 1928 – September 24, 2016) was an American ice hockey player. He won a silver medal at the 1952 Winter Olympics. He was born in Eveleth, Minnesota, and attended Colorado College.

Gambucci died on September 24, 2016, at the age 87 due to complications from congestive heart failure.

References 

1928 births
2016 deaths
American men's ice hockey players
Colorado College Tigers men's ice hockey players
Ice hockey players from Minnesota
Ice hockey players at the 1952 Winter Olympics
Medalists at the 1952 Winter Olympics
Olympic silver medalists for the United States in ice hockey
People from Eveleth, Minnesota
NCAA men's ice hockey national champions